Gravitas is the thirteenth studio album by British rock group Asia, released in 2014. It is the group's final studio album with vocalist/bassist John Wetton before his death in 2017 and the only one to feature guitarist Sam Coulson.

Gravitas was released on CD, deluxe edition CD/DVD-Video (featuring bonus tracks, the "Valkyrie" music video, the making of the album and three tracks recorded live with a full symphonic orchestra in Plovdiv, Bulgaria) and LP. A music video for "Valkyrie" was shot in January 2014 in Los Angeles.

Production
Asia began to work on the new album in the end of June 2013. As this time they decided not to invite an outside producer, it was produced by Wetton and keyboard player Geoff Downes. The instruments were recorded at Steve Rispin's Liscombe Park Studios, located in Buckinghamshire countryside west of Bedfordshire town Leighton Buzzard, where the group had worked on all their previous studio recordings since the reunion in 2006. The vocals were done at Aubitt Studios in Southampton, Hampshire, by Rob Aubrey. The album was mixed and mastered by John Mitchell at Outhouse Studios in Reading, Berkshire, from October to December 2013. "I Would Die for You" was written by Wetton and Downes in 1986 as opposed to the rest of the songs, which were composed in 2013.

Gravitas was originally announced under the name of Valkyrie, but the title was later changed. The cover artwork was designed by Roger Dean, who had collaborated with Asia since their debut album, released in 1982.

Reception
Matt Collar gave the album a rating of three stars out of five on AllMusic. He noted that "Asia have always moved back and forth between their radio-friendly pop side and more classical-influenced progressive side" and Gravitas "bends more toward the latter, showcasing Downes and Wetton's longstanding partnership as thoughtful songwriters and technically proficient arrangers". "Valkyrie", "Nyctophobia" and "I Would Die for You" were selected as three "Track Picks".

Gravitas was less successful in terms of sales than its predecessor, but still managed to reach the UK Albums Chart and the US Billboard 200.

Track listing

Personnel

Asia
 John Wetton – lead vocal, acoustic and bass guitars; producer
 Geoff Downes – keyboards; producer
 Sam Coulson – guitars
 Carl Palmer – drums

Additional musicians
 Katinka Kleijn – cello (on "Valkyrie")

Technical personnel
 Steve Rispin – engineer
 Rob Aubrey – engineer (vocals) (at Aubitt Studios, Southampton, Hampshire)
 John Mitchell – mixing and mastering engineer (at Outhouse Studios, Reading, Berkshire)
 Devin DeHaven – producer and director ("Valkyrie" music video and the making of Gravitas)
 Roger Dean – paintings, logotypes
 Michael Inns – photography
 John Price – photography

Charts

Release history

References

Asia (band) albums
2014 albums
Frontiers Records albums
Albums produced by John Wetton
Albums produced by Geoff Downes
Albums with cover art by Roger Dean (artist)